Wild & Free is the second and final studio album by indie rock band A Rocket to the Moon. It was released in 2013 on Fueled By Ramen.

Track listing

Charts

References

2013 albums
A Rocket to the Moon albums
Fueled by Ramen albums